Emmanuel Simwanza (born 12 December 1992) is a retired Tanzanian football defender.

References

1992 births
Living people
Tanzanian footballers
Tanzania international footballers
African Lyon F.C. players
Mwadui United F.C. players
Simba S.C. players
Maji Maji F.C. players
Association football defenders
Tanzanian Premier League players